Lucas Solbat is a Papua New Guinean former professional rugby league footballer who represented Papua New Guinea national rugby league team in the 1995 and 2000 World Cups.

Playing career
Solbat played for the Papua New Guinea side in both the 1995 and 2000 World Cups, scoring a try in the 1995 tournament.

Domestically, Solbat played for the Rabaul Gurias in the Papua New Guinea National Rugby League competition.

References

1971 births
Living people
Papua New Guinean rugby league players
Papua New Guinea national rugby league team players
Rugby league props
Rabaul Gurias players